The Sacrifice is a 1979 Turkish drama film, directed by Atıf Yılmaz and written by Başar Sabuncu based on a true story by Faruk Erem, featuring a peasant who sacrifices his youngest child to God. The "pathological tale," according to Rekin Teksoy, "focuses on superstitious belief through the interjection of eyewitness accounts." It was scheduled to compete in the cancelled 17th Antalya Golden Orange Film Festival, for which it received Belated Golden Oranges for Best Screenplay and Best Actor.

Awards
17th Antalya Golden Orange Film Festival:
Belated Golden Orange for Best Screenplay: Başar Sabuncu (won)
Belated Golden Orange for Best Actor: Tarık Akan (won, also for The Herd, shared with Aytaç Arman for The Enemy)

References

External links

Films set in Turkey
1970s Turkish-language films
1979 drama films
1979 films
Turkish drama films